Akhaj is a village in Mehsana Taluka of Mehsana district in the state of Gujarat, India.

History 
The village was situated on the way of Anahilawad Patan and Ashapalli (modern Ahmedabad) in ancient times.

Demographics 
As of 2011, Akhaj has a population of 4634: 2404 men and 2230 women.

Places of interest

Shakti Kund 
There is a stepped reservoir known as Shakti Kund in village. It was built in the third quarter of the 10th century during Chaulukya rule (Māru-Gurjara architecture). It is older than the Surya Kunda at the Sun temple of Modhera.There are number of fragments of the extinct temple and gateway (kirtitorana) nearby so there must be a temple dedicated to Goddess in the past and the Kunda was associated with it. The fragments include pillars and capitals, beams and arches, figures of divinities and others, fragments of spire (shikhara), cogged wheel (amalaka) and cupola (kalasha). The square kunda has round well in the centre which can be reached by flight of steps with three levels of landings and the principal platform at the top. The niches below these steps containing eight statues of Ganesha in various forms as well as other deities such as Shitala, Agni, Brahma, Yama, Yami, Lakshmi, Saptarishi,  Matrika, Mahishasurmardini, Harihararka (composite of Shiva, Vishnu and Surya), Varuna, Lajjagauri, Indrani, Nriti, Kubera, Kartikeya. Some figures are unidentifiable due to erosion and damage. It is the state protected monument (S-GJ-284).

There is a Shiva temple nearby.

Economy
Agriculture is the main source of income for this village.

References

Villages in Mehsana district